Pentidotea wosnesenskii is a marine isopod which lives on seaweed on rocky shores along the British Columbia and Washington coastlines, as far south as San Francisco. It was described as Idotea wosnesenskii in 1851, by Johann Friedrich von Brandt, and is named after the Russian biologist Ilya G. Voznesensky. The isopod grows up to 4 centimetres in length and is usually green in colour.

It is preyed upon by the surf scoter.

References

Valvifera
Crustaceans of the eastern Pacific Ocean
Crustaceans described in 1851